The 2019–20 season is Bradford City's 117th season in their history and the first season back in EFL League Two following the club's relegation the season before. Along with League Two, the club will also participate in the FA Cup, EFL Cup and EFL Trophy.

The season covers the period from 1 July 2019 to 30 June 2020.

Pre-season
On 23 May 2019 it was announced that the Bantams would face local city rivals Bradford Park Avenue. Following this announcement, Bradford City arranged a further two friendlies to be played against Rochdale A.F.C. and Brighouse Town F.C. A home game was added to the pre-season schedule on 20 July where City would face Wigan Athletic. Another local friendly was announce as Eccleshill United F.C. would host the Bantams. Bolton Wanderers had three of their friendlies cancelled leading Bradford to agree to play a Behind closed doors friendly against them.

Competitions

League Two

League table

Result summary

Results by matchday

Matches
On Thursday, 20 June 2019, the EFL League Two fixtures were revealed.

FA Cup

The first round draw was made on 21 October 2019.

EFL Cup

The first round draw was made on 20 June.

EFL Trophy

On 9 July 2019, the pre-determined group stage draw was announced with Invited clubs to be drawn on 12 July 2019.

Squad Statistics

Statistics accurate as of 25 April 2020

Transfers

Transfers in

Loans in

Loans out

Transfers out

Notes

References

Bradford City A.F.C. seasons
Bradford City